Scott Pedder (born 1976) is an Australian rally driver who won the 2014 Australian Rally Championship driving a Renault Clio.

Career Highlights 
 Driver for Factory Mitsubishi Team in the 2005 and 2006 Australian Rally Championship and Mitsubishi Japan for the 2008 Asia-Pacific Championship.
 Outright Wins in 2005 Rally South Australia and 2006 Rally of Melbourne.
 2nd Outright 2002 and 2003 International (APRC) Rally of Canberra.
 12 Event Podium Placings 2002–2006.
 1998 Round Australia Rally Finisher (6th).
 1999 and 2000 Victorian Rally Champion.
 CEO of the Bosch Australian Rally Championship in October 2012.
 Winner of the 2014 Australian Rally Championship driving a Renault Clio
 Placed 18th in the WRC2 Drivers standings of the 2015 World Rally Championship

References

External links 
 Scotts Profile on ARC Website
 ewrc-results.com profile

Australian rally drivers
1976 births
Living people